Journey into Light is a 1951 American crime film noir directed by Stuart Heisler and starring Sterling Hayden.

Plot
John Burrows, an ordained minister from a small village in eastern USA, envisions himself with a larger congregation. He is mortified when his wife drunkenly interrupts a sermon, then despondent after her suicide.

Burrows travels to Los Angeles for a fresh start, but ends up on skid row and arrested for apparent public intoxication. A skid-row con man, Gandy, finds him a bed at a flop house, while a street preacher, Doc Thorssen, and daughter Christine take him to a local mission.

Christine is blind. She falls in love with Burrows, enjoying his discussions of the spirit and the soul but knowing little of his past. One day she is struck by a streetcar and knocked unconscious, causing Burrows to once again question his faith.

He ultimately accepts the Lord's will and is offered a better place to live and preach. Burrows decides he is better suited to the mission, with Christine by his side.

Cast
 Sterling Hayden as Rev. John Burrows
 Viveca Lindfors as Christine Thorssen
 Thomas Mitchell as Gandy
 Ludwig Donath as 'Doc' Thorssen
 H. B. Warner as Wiz, the Wino
 Jane Darwell as Mack
 John Berkes as Racky
 Peggy Webber as Jane Burrows
 Paul Guilfoyle as Fanatic

See also
 Sterling Hayden filmography

References

External links
 

1951 films
1951 crime drama films
1950s English-language films
1950s American films
20th Century Fox films
American black-and-white films
American crime drama films
Films about blind people
Films about religion
Films directed by Stuart Heisler
Films scored by Emil Newman
Films scored by Paul Dunlap
Films set in Los Angeles